Marek Vorel (27 August 1977 in Brno) is a former professional Czech ice hockey player. Vorel played the centre position.

Vorel played in the Czech Extraliga for HC Kometa Brno, HC Kladno, HC Zlín, HC Znojemští Orli, HC Plzeň and HC Pardubice. He also played in the SM-liiga for Ilves, the Slovak Extraliga for HC Slovan Bratislava and HC Košice and the Russian Superleague and Kontinental Hockey League for Traktor Chelyabinsk. Vorel played 399 games in the Czech Extraliga and scored 67 goals.

References

External links

1977 births
Living people
Czech ice hockey centres
HC Dynamo Pardubice players
Czech expatriate ice hockey players in Russia
Kassel Huskies players
Rytíři Kladno players
HC Kometa Brno players
HC Košice players
Ilves players
Orli Znojmo players
HC Plzeň players
HC Slovan Bratislava players
Ice hockey people from Brno
Traktor Chelyabinsk players
PSG Berani Zlín players
Czech expatriate ice hockey players in Slovakia
Czech expatriate ice hockey players in Germany
Czech expatriate ice hockey players in Finland